Washington Academy (formerly Washington Grammar School and then Washington School) is a co-educational secondary school located in Washington in the City of Sunderland, Tyne and Wear, England.

History
It was original established as a grammar school but then later became a comprehensive community school administered by Sunderland City Council, with a specialism in technology. The school relocated to new buildings in 2009.

In September 2017 Washington School converted to academy status and was renamed Washington Academy. The school is now sponsored by the Consilium Academies Trust.

Academics
Washington Academy offers GCSEs and vocational courses as programmes of study for pupils. Most graduating students go on to attend Sunderland College which acts as the school's partner further education provider.

Notable former pupils

Washington School
 Fraser Kemp, Labour MP from 1997 to 2010 for Houghton and Washington East

Washington Grammar School
 Prof Laing Barden CBE, vice-chancellor from 1992 to 1996 of the University of Northumbria at Newcastle, and director from 1978 to 1992 of Newcastle Polytechnic
 C. Thomas Elliott CBE FRS, scientist in the fields of narrow gap semiconductor and infrared detector research
 Bryan Ferry, singer-songwriter
 Willie Hamilton, Labour MP from 1950 to 1974 for West Fife and from 1974 to 1987 for Central Fife
 Howard Kendall, managed Everton in the 1980s
 Prof Gavin Kitching, Professor of Social Sciences since 1991 at the University of New South Wales 
 Dame Anne Owers (née Spark) CBE, former chief inspector of prisons

References

External links
[www.washingtonacademy.co.uk/ Washington Academy official website]

Secondary schools in the City of Sunderland
Washington, Tyne and Wear
Academies in the City of Sunderland